Ościsłowo  is a village in the administrative district of Gmina Glinojeck, within Ciechanów County, Masovian Voivodeship, in east-central Poland.

During the German occupation of Poland (World War II), Ościsłowo was the site of large massacres, in which several hundreds of Poles were murdered as part of the Intelligenzaktion. Also several dozen disabled from the region were murdered in the village on February 20, 1940.

Notable people
  (born 1935), Polish diplomat
  (born 1936), Polish literary scholar, professor, university teacher

References

Villages in Ciechanów County
Nazi war crimes in Poland